Conewago Creek is a  tributary of the Susquehanna River in Lebanon, Dauphin, and Lancaster counties in Pennsylvania in the United States.

Name
The name of the creek comes from the Lenape, meaning "at the rapids".

Course
Conewago Creek flows generally southwest its entire length. The source is in Lebanon County in West Cornwall Township near the census-designated place of Mount Gretna Heights. It then flows through the borough of Mount Gretna and into South Londonderry Township and the census-designated place of Timber Hills. A small southern portion of South Annville Township is also in the watershed.

As Conewago Creek leaves Lebanon County, it forms the border between Dauphin County (to the north) and Lancaster County (to the south). In Dauphin County, the creek runs by Conewago Township first, then Londonderry Township. In Lancaster County, it runs by Mount Joy Township, West Donegal Township, just north of the borough of Elizabethtown, and finally Conoy Township.

Watershed
Sections of four other tributaries, including Lynch Run, Hoffer Creek, and two unnamed tributaries, are also impaired. Agricultural surface runoff and sediment are the major pollutants.

Tributaries
Little Conewago Creek
Hoffer Creek
Brills Run
Lynch Run

Recreation

Edward Gertler writes that Conewago Creek is "a fascinating little creek that is alternately either very easy or very exciting".

Several hiking trails are located in the Conewago Creek watershed, including the Conewago Recreational Trail, Lebanon Valley Rails-to-Trail, and Horse Shoe Trail.

Conewago Creek between Dauphin and Lancaster counties has been designated as approved trout waters by the Pennsylvania Fish and Boat Commission. This means the waters will be stocked with trout and may be fished during trout season.

See also
List of rivers of Pennsylvania

References

Rivers of Pennsylvania
Tributaries of the Susquehanna River
Rivers of Lancaster County, Pennsylvania
Rivers of Lebanon County, Pennsylvania
Rivers of Dauphin County, Pennsylvania